A virtually safe dose (VSD) may be determined for those carcinogens not assumed to have a threshold. Virtually safe doses are calculated by regulatory agencies to represent the level of exposure to such carcinogenic agents at which an excess of cancers greater than that level accepted by society is not expected.

See also 
 Dose-response relationship
 Linear no-threshold model

References 

Toxicology